Freudis Rojas (born August 13, 1998) is an American professional boxer. As an amateur he won a bronze medal at the 2017 World Championships.

Amateur career

World Championships result
Hamburg 2017
First round: Defeated Hadi Srour (Norway) 5–0
Second round: Defeated Vitaly Dunaytsev (Russia) 4–1
Quarter-finals: Defeated Eslam El-Gendy (Egypt) 5–0
Semi-finals: Defeated by Ikboljon Kholdarov (Uzbekistan) 4–1

Professional boxing record

References

External links

Profile for Freudis Rojas from Team USA

Living people
1998 births
American male boxers
Boxers from Nevada
Sportspeople from Las Vegas
Light-welterweight boxers
Welterweight boxers
Southpaw boxers
AIBA World Boxing Championships medalists